The European rabbit (Oryctolagus cuniculus) or coney is a species of rabbit native to the Iberian Peninsula (including Spain, Portugal, and southwestern France), western France, and the northern Atlas Mountains in northwest Africa. It has been widely introduced elsewhere, often with devastating effects on local biodiversity. Its decline in its native range due to myxomatosis, rabbit calicivirus, overhunting and habitat loss has caused the decline of the Iberian lynx (Lynx pardinus) and Spanish imperial eagle (Aquila adalberti). It is known as an invasive species because it has been introduced to countries on all continents with the exception of Antarctica, and has caused many problems within the environment and ecosystems; in particular, European rabbits in Australia have had a devastating impact, due in part to the lack of natural predators there.

The European rabbit is well known for digging networks of burrows, called warrens, where it spends most of its time when not feeding. Unlike the related hares (Lepus spp.), rabbits are altricial, the young being born blind and furless, in a fur-lined nest in the warren, and they are totally dependent upon their mothers. Much of the modern research into wild rabbit behaviour was carried out in the 1960s by two research centres. One was the naturalist Ronald Lockley, who maintained a number of large enclosures for wild rabbit colonies, with observation facilities, in Orielton, Pembrokeshire. Apart from publishing a number of scientific papers, he popularised his findings in a book The Private Life of the Rabbit, which is credited by Richard Adams as having played a key role in his gaining "a knowledge of rabbits and their ways" that informed his novel Watership Down. The other group was the Commonwealth Scientific and Industrial Research Organisation (CSIRO) in Australia, where numerous studies of the social behavior of wild rabbits were performed. Since the onset of myxomatosis, and the decline of the significance of the rabbit as an agricultural pest, few large-scale studies have been performed and many aspects of rabbit behaviour are still poorly understood.

Naming and etymology
Because of its non-British origin, the species does not have native names in English or Celtic, with the usual terms "cony" and "rabbit" being foreign loanwords. "Rabbit" is also pronounced as rabbidge, rabbert (North Devon) and rappit (Cheshire and Lancashire). More archaic spellings include rabbette (15th-16th centuries), rabet (15th-17th centuries), rabbet (16th-18th centuries), rabatte (16th century), rabytt (17th century) and rabit (18th century). The root word is the Walloon rabett, which was once commonly used in Liège. Rabett itself is derived from the Middle Dutch robbe, with the addition of the suffix -ett.

The term "cony" or "coney" antedates "rabbit", and first occurred during the 13th century to refer to the animal's pelt. Later, "cony" referred to the adult animal, while "rabbit" referred to the young. The root of "cony" is the old French connil or counil, of which the Norman plural was coniz, and later conis. Its forerunner is the Greek κύνικλος, from which the Latin cuniculus is derived. The origin of κύνικλος itself is unclear: Ælian, who lived during the third century, linked the word to Celtiberian and later authors relate it to its Basque name unchi; Varo and Pliny connected it to cuneus, which refers to a wedge, thus making reference to the animal's digging ability.

The species' dwelling place is termed a warren or cony-garth. "Warren" comes from the Old English wareine, itself derived from the Old French warenne, varenne, or garenne. The root word is the Low Latin warenna, which originally signified a preserve in general, only to be later used to refer specifically to an enclosure set apart for rabbits and hares. "Cony-garth" derives from the Middle English conygerthe, which may be a compound of connynge+erthe (cony+earth). The term stems from the Old French conniniere or coninyere, and later conilliere. The root word is the Low Latin cunicularia, the feminine form of the adjective cunicularius, which pertains to the rabbit.

Taxonomy
Originally assigned to the genus Lepus, the European rabbit was consigned to its own genus in 1874 on account of its altricial young, its burrowing habits, and numerous skeletal characters. It is superficially similar to the North American cottontails (Sylvilagus) in that they are born blind and naked, have white flesh, and little sexual dimorphism. However, they differ in skull characteristics, and cottontails do not habitually construct their own burrows as the European rabbit does. Molecular studies confirm that the resemblance between the two is due to convergent evolution, and that the European rabbit's closest relatives are the hispid hare, the riverine rabbit, and the Amami rabbit. The oldest known fossils attributed to the modern European rabbit species are around 0.5 Ma old (Middle Pleistocene).

The cladogram is from Matthee et al., 2004, based on nuclear and mitochondrial gene analysis.

Subspecies
, six subspecies are recognised by MSW3. Genetic studies undertaken in 2008, however, indicate only two subspecies, O. c. algirus and O. c. cuniculus, with a hybrid zone connecting the two populations in central Iberia.

Description

The European rabbit is smaller than the European hare and mountain hare, and lacks black ear tips, as well as having proportionately shorter legs. An adult European rabbit can measure  in length, and weigh .

Size and weight vary according to food and habitat quality, with rabbits living on light soil with nothing but grass to feed on being noticeably smaller than specimens living on highly cultivated farmlands with plenty of roots and clover. Pure European rabbits weighing  and upwards are uncommon, but are occasionally reported. Unlike the brown hare, the male European rabbit is more heavily built than the female. The penis is short, and lacks a baculum and true glans.

The fur of the European rabbit is generally greyish-brown, but this is subject to much variation. The guard hairs are banded brown and black, or grey, while the nape of the neck and scrotum are reddish. The chest patch is brown, while the rest of the underparts are white or grey. A white star shape is often present on kits' foreheads, but rarely occurs in adults. The whiskers are long and black, and the feet are fully furred and buff-coloured. The tail has a white underside, which becomes prominent when escaping danger. This may act as a signal for other rabbits to run.

Moulting occurs once a year, beginning in March on the face and spreading over the back. The underfur is completely replaced by October–November. The European rabbit exhibits great variation in colour, from light sandy, to dark grey and completely black. Such variation depends largely on the amount of guard hairs relative to regular pelage. Melanists are not uncommon in mainland Europe, though albinoes are rare.

Life history and behaviour

Social and territorial behaviours
The European rabbit lives in warrens that contain 2-10 other individuals living in smaller groups to ensure greater breeding success. Territoriality and aggression contribute greatly to the rabbits' maturation process, and help ensure survival of the population. Females tend to be more territorial than males, although the areas most frequented by females are not defended. Territories are marked with dung hills. The size of the species' home range varies according to habitat, food, shelter, cover from predators, and breeding sites, though it is generally small, encompassing about 0.3-0.7 hectares. Except during times of low rabbit density and abundance of high-quality food, male ranges tend to be larger than those held by females. The European rabbit rarely strays far from its burrow; when feeding on cultivated fields, it typically only moves 25 m away from its burrow, and rarely 50 m. It may, however, move as far as 500 m after an abrupt change in environment, such as a harvest. This behaviour may be an antipredator adaptation, as rabbits in areas where predators are under rigorous control may move three times further from their burrows than those in areas without predator management.

The European rabbit is a gregarious animal, which lives in stable social groups centred around females sharing access to one or more burrow systems. Social structures tend to be looser in areas where burrow construction is relatively easy. Dominance hierarchies exist in parallel for both bucks and does. Among bucks, status is determined through access to does, with dominant bucks siring the majority of the colony's offspring. The dominant does have priority access to the best nesting sites, with competition over such sites often leading to serious injury or death. Subordinate does, particularly in large colonies, typically resort to using single-entrance breeding spots far from the main warren, thus making themselves vulnerable to fox or badger predation.

Reproduction and development
In the European rabbit's mating system, dominant bucks exhibit polygyny, whereas lower-status individuals (both bucks and does) often form monogamous breeding relationships. Rabbits signal their readiness to copulate by marking other animals and inanimate objects with an odoriferous substance secreted though a chin gland, in a process known as "chinning". Though male European rabbits may sometimes be amicable with one another, fierce fights can erupt among bucks during the breeding season, typically January to August. A succession of litters (usually three to seven kittens each) are produced, but in overpopulated areas, pregnant does may lose all their embryos through intrauterine resorption. Shortly before giving birth, the doe constructs a separate burrow known as a "stop" or "stab", generally in an open field away from the main warren. These breeding burrows are typically a few feet long and are lined with grass and moss, as well as fur plucked from the doe's belly. The breeding burrow protects the kits from adult bucks and predators.

The gestation period of the European rabbit is 30 days, with the sex ratio of male to female kits tending to be 1:1. Greater maternal investment over male offspring may result in higher birth weights for bucks. Kits born to the dominant buck and doe—which enjoy better nesting and feeding grounds—tend to grow larger and stronger and to become more dominant than those born to subordinate rabbits. Not uncommonly, European rabbits  mate again immediately after giving birth, with some specimens having been observed to nurse previous young whilst pregnant.

Female European rabbits nurse their kits once a night, for only a few minutes. After suckling is complete, the doe seals the entrance to the stop with soil and vegetation. European rabbit kits are born blind, deaf, and nearly naked. The ears do not gain the power of motion until 10 days of age, and can be erected after 13. The eyes open 11 days after birth. At 18 days, the kittens begin to leave the burrow. Sexual maturity in bucks is attained at 4 months, while does can begin to breed at 3-5 months.

Burrowing behaviour
The European rabbit's burrows occur mostly on slopes and banks, where drainage is more efficient. The burrow entrances are typically 10–50 cm in diameter, and are easily recognisable by the bare earth at their mouths. Vegetation growth is prevented by the constant passing and repassing of the resident rabbits. Big burrows are complex excavations which may descend to depths of several feet. They are not constructed on any specified plan, and appear to be enlarged or improved as a result of the promiscuous activity of several generations. Digging is done by pulling the soil backwards with the fore feet and throwing it between the hind legs, which scatter the material with kicking motions. While most burrows are dug from the outside, some warrens feature holes dug from the inside, which act as emergency exits when escaping from predators below ground. These holes usually descend perpendicularly to 3–4 feet, and their mouths lack the bare-earth characteristic of burrow entrances. While kits sleep in chambers lined with grass and fur, adults sleep on the bare earth, likely to prevent damp, with warmth being secured by huddling. Although both sexes dig, does do so more skillfully, and for longer periods.

Communication
The European rabbit is a relatively quiet animal, though it has at least two vocalisations. The best-known is a high treble scream or squeal. This distress call has been likened to the cry of a piglet. This sound is uttered when in extreme distress, such as being caught by a predator or trap. During the spring, bucks express contentment by emitting grunting sounds when approaching other rabbits. These grunts are similar to shrill hiccups, and are emitted with the mouth closed. Aggression is expressed with a low growl.

Ecology

Habitat
The European rabbit's ideal habitat consists of short grasslands with secure refuge (such as burrows, boulders, hedgerows, scrub, and woodland) near feeding areas. It may dwell up to treeline, as long as the land is well-drained and shelter is available. The size and distribution of its burrow systems depend on the type of soil present; in areas with loose soil, it selects sites with supporting structures, such as tree roots or shrubs to prevent burrow collapse. Warrens tend to be larger and have more interconnected tunnels in areas with chalk than those in sand. In large coniferous plantations, the species only occurs on peripheral areas and along fire breaks and rides.

Diet
The European rabbit eats a wide variety of herbage, especially grasses, favouring the young, succulent leaves and shoots of the most nutritious species, particularly fescues. In mixed cultivated areas, winter wheat is preferred over maize and dicotyledons. During the summer, the European rabbit feeds on the shortest, and therefore less nutritious grass swards, thus indicating that grazing grounds are selected through antipredator considerations rather than maximising food intake. In times of scarcity, the rabbit increases its food intake, selecting the parts of the plant with the highest nitrogen content. Hungry rabbits in winter may resort to eating tree bark. Blackberries are also eaten, and captive-bred European rabbits have been fed on fodder consisting of furze and acorns, which can lead to considerable weight gain. The European rabbit is a less fussy eater than the brown hare; when eating root vegetables, the rabbit eats them whole, while the hare tends to leave the peel. Depending on the body's fat and protein reserves, the species can survive without food in winter for about 2–8 days. Although herbivorous, cases are known of rabbits eating snails.

Like other leporids, the European rabbit produces soft, mucus-covered faecal pellets, which are ingested directly from the anus. The soft pellets are produced posterior to the colon in the hind gut soon after the excretion of hard pellets and the stomach begins to fill with newly grazed food. The soft pellets are filled with protein-rich bacteria, and pass down to the rectum in glossy clusters. The rabbit swallows them whole, without perforating the enveloping membrane.

Predators
The European rabbit is prey to many different predatory species. Foxes, dingoes, wolves, lynxes, wolverines, and dogs kill both adult and young rabbits by stalking and surprising them in the open, but relatively few rabbits are caught this way, as they can quickly rush back to cover with a burst of speed. Further, evidence from a study in Spain suggests they may avoid areas where the recent scat of predators which have eaten rabbit is detected. Both foxes and badgers dig out kittens from shallow burrows, with the latter predators being too slow to catch adult rabbits. Both wild and domestic cats can stalk and leap upon rabbits, particularly young specimens leaving their burrows for the first time. Wildcats take rabbits according to availability; in eastern Scotland, where rabbits are abundant, they can make up over 90% of the wildcats' diet. Most domestic cats are incapable of killing healthy, full-grown adults, but will take weak and diseased ones. Does can be fiercely protective of their kits, having been observed to chase away large cats and mustelids, including ferrets, stoats, and weasels. However, rabbits typically run from mustelids, and may fear them innately. Cases are known of rabbits becoming paralysed with fear and dying when pursued by stoats or weasels, even when rescued unharmed. 

The European rabbit makes up 85% of the polecat's diet, and its availability is important to the success of breeding female mink. Brown rats can be a serious threat to kittens, as they will reside in rabbit burrows during the summer, and attack them in groups. Although many birds of prey are capable of killing rabbits, few are strong enough to carry them. Large species, such as golden and sea eagles, may carry rabbits back to their nests, while small eagles, buzzards, and harriers struggle to do so. Hawks and owls typically only carry off very small kits.

Diseases and parasites
The European rabbit is the only species fatally attacked by myxomatosis. The most lethal strain has a five-day incubation period, after which the eyelids swell, with the inflammation quickly spreading to the base of the ears, the forehead, and nose. At the same time, the anal and genital areas also swell. During the last stages of the disease, the swellings discharge a fluid rich in viral material, with death usually following on the 11th-12th day of infection. In Britain, the primary carrier of myxomatosis is the flea Spilopsyllus cuniculi, while in Australia it is mosquitoes.

Rabbit haemorrhagic disease (RHD), also known as viral haemorrhagic disease or rabbit calicivirus disease in Australia, is specific to the European rabbit, and causes lesions of acute necrotising hepatitis, disseminated intravascular coagulation, and haemorrhaging, mainly in the lungs. Susceptible specimens may die within 30 hours of infection. Most rabbits in the UK are immune to RHD, due to exposure to a weaker strain.

Human relationship with rabbits

Recent research has shown that all European rabbits carry common genetic markers and descend from one of two maternal lines. These lines originated between 12,000 and 6.5 million years ago when glaciers isolated two herds, one on the Iberian Peninsula and the other in Southern France. Humans likely began hunting rabbits as a food source, but further research needs to be done to verify this. Little comprehensive evidence of the relationship of humans with European rabbits is documented until the medieval period.

Humans' relationship with the European rabbit was first recorded by the Phoenicians prior to 1000 BC, when they termed the Iberian Peninsula i-Shaphan-ím (literally, the land of the hyraxes). This phrase closely resembles related modern Hebrew: I (אי) meaning island and shafan (שפן) meaning hyrax, plural shfaním (שפנים). Phoenicians called the local rabbits 'hyraxes' because rabbits resemble hyraxes in some ways, and hyraxes are native to Phoenicia, unlike rabbits. Hyraxes, like rabbits, are not rodents. One theory states that the Romans converted the phrase i-Shaphan-ím, with influence from the Greek Spania, to its Latin form, Hispania, which evolved in all the Iberian languages - into Castilian España, Portuguese Espanha, Catalan Espanya (English "Spain"), and such other variations in modern languages. Different views have been voiced on the precise meaning of shafan, but the balance of opinion appears to indicate that the hyrax is indeed the intended meaning.

Like the Phoenicians, neither the later Greek nor Roman colonizers had a specific name for the rabbit, because the species is not native to Greece and Italy (though it is present there nowadays). They commonly called it "small hare" and "small digging hare", in contrast to the European hare, which is larger and doesn't make burrows. Catullus used the name cuniculus (a latinization of the Iberian word kiniklos and the etymological origin of the Castilian name conejo, Portuguese coelho and Catalan conill, and the old English name, coney), and referenced its abundance in Celtiberia by calling this region cuniculosa, i.e. rabbit-ridden.

The European rabbit is the only rabbit species that has been domesticated and all 305 global rabbit breeds— from Netherland Dwarf to Flemish Giant— are descendants of the European rabbit. Rabbits are an example of an animal that can be treated as a food, a pet, or a pest by different members of the same culture. In some urban areas, infestations of feral European rabbits (descended from pets) have become a problem. Helsinki, for example, host to one of the northernmost populations of the species, had an estimated 2,500 European rabbits at the end of 2006, doubling to 5,000 by autumn 2007. In Iceland, populations of O. cuniculus are found in urban Reykjavik as well as in the Vestmannaeyjar archipelago. In Finland, the introduced European rabbit vies with the native lagomorphs: the European hare and the mountain hare.

As an introduced species

The European rabbit has been introduced as an exotic species into several environments, often with harmful results to vegetation and local wildlife, making it an invasive species. The first known mention of the rabbit as an invasive species (and possibly the first documented instance of an invasive species ever) was made in regard to the introduction of the rabbit to the Balearic Islands after the Roman conquest of the first century BCE. According to both Strabo and Pliny the Elder, the multiplying rabbits caused famines by destroying crop yields and even collapsed trees and houses with their burrowing. The inhabitants petitioned Augustus for help, who sent troops to curb the rabbit population with the help of ferrets.

Other locations where the European rabbit was introduced include Great Britain; the Hawaiian Islands of Laysan Island (in 1903) and Lisianski Island; Oceania's Macquarie Island; Washington's Smith Island and San Juan Island (around 1900 and later spreading to the other San Juan Islands); several islands off the coast of Southern Africa (including Robben Island); and Australia and New Zealand. The two accounts over the introduction of rabbits in Ukraine are conflicting. One holds that the species was brought there in the early 20th century by Austrian nobleman Graf Malokhovsky, who released them on his estate near the Khadzhibey Estuary, while another holds that rabbits were first brought to Kherson from Switzerland in 1894-1895 by landowner Pinkovsky.

In the British Isles
The European rabbit is widespread in both Great Britain, Ireland, and most islands, except for Isles of Scilly, Rùm, Tiree, and some small Scottish islands, such as Gunna, Sanday, and most of the Treshnish Isles. It was likely first brought to Britain by the Normans after the 1066 conquest of England, as no pre-Norman British allusions to the animal have been found. The rabbit was nonetheless scarce or absent throughout most of England a short time afterwards, as warrens are not mentioned in the Domesday Book or any other 11th-century documents. Rabbits became well known, but not necessarily accepted members of British fauna between the 12th and 13th centuries, with the first real evidence of their presence consisting of a number of bones from the midden of Rayleigh Castle, which was occupied from the 11th-13th centuries. The first references to rabbits in Ireland occur roughly at the same time as English ones, thus indicating another Norman introduction. They had become plentiful, probably at a local level, by the 13th century, as indicated by an inquisition of Lundy Island made in 1274 describing how 2,000 rabbits were caught annually. Subsequent allusions in official documents became more frequent, with the species later becoming an important food item in feasts.

Increases in truly wild populations occurred slowly, primarily in the coastal areas and lowland heaths of Breckland and Norfolk. Notable population increases occurred after 1750, when changes in agricultural practices created favourable habitat, and increasing interest in game management resulted in intensive predator control campaigns. Although now common in the Scottish lowlands, the species was little known in Scotland before the 19th century. Until then, it was confined to portions of the Edinburgh district at least as far back as the 16th century, certain islands and the coastal sand dunes of the Scottish mainland. Although unknown in Caithness in 1743, the species became well established there by 1793. Myxomatosis entered Britain from France in 1953, and reached Ireland by 1954, prompting the RSPB to set up "mercy squads" meant to euthanise myxomatous rabbits. Major myxomatosis outbreaks still occur in Britain, peaking twice annually in during spring and especially in the late summer or autumn periods, though immunity has reduced the mortality rate from 99% to 5-33%.

Between 1996 and 2018, rabbit numbers fell by 88% in the east Midlands, 83% in Scotland, and 43% across the whole of the UK. Numbers are still falling (in 2021). Pip Mountjoy, Shifting Sands project manager at Natural England said, "They (rabbits) are actually an endangered species in their native region on the Iberian peninsula. It's surprising for people that rabbits are important in some ecosystems. We think of them as a pest but in Britain they are a keystone species – they act as landscape managers and a lot of other species rely on them." The Shifting Sands project aims to encourage landowners to create safe habitats for rabbits, consisting of piles of branches placed near existing rabbit warrens. Species that depend in rabbits' grazing habits include purple milk vetch, rare spring sedge, spring speedwell, prostrate perennial knawel, caterpillars of the lunar yellow underwing moth, stone curlew, and the large blue butterfly.

In Australia

Twenty-four specimens of the European rabbit were introduced to Australia in 1859 by estate owner Thomas Austin in Victoria. Their descendants multiplied and spread throughout the country due to the lack of natural predators, a conducive habitat (provided by widespread farming), and the mild Australian winters that allowed year-round breeding. Australia's native equivalent, the bilby, was quickly pushed out by the invasive rabbit. (The bilbies are endangered, but are now making a comeback due to government protection.) Between 1901 and 1907, Australia built an immense "rabbit-proof fence" to halt the westward expansion of the infestation. The European rabbit, however, can not only jump very high, but also burrow underground, making fencing essentially futile. 

During the 1950s, the intentional introduction of a virus that causes myxomatosis provided some relief in Australia, but not in New Zealand, where the insect vectors necessary for the spread of the disease were not present. Myxomatosis can also infect pet rabbits (the same species). Today's remaining feral rabbits in Australia are largely immune to myxomatosis. A second deadly rabbit virus, rabbit hemorrhagic disease (RHD), has been cleared in Australia as a biological control agent and has already killed millions of the European rabbits there. RHD was also introduced—illegally— in New Zealand with less success due to improper timing.

In Chile
The exact date on which the European rabbit was introduced into Chile is unknown, though the first references to it occur during the mid-18th century. By the 19th century, several authors referred to the presence of both rabbits and rabbit hutches in central Chile. The importation and breeding of rabbits was encouraged by the state, as rabbits were seen as cheap sources of food for peasants. Whether or not their escape into the wild was intentional is unknown, but warnings over the dangers of feral rabbits were raised during the early 20th century, and the species had propagated dramatically by the late 1920s in central Chile, Tierra del Fuego, and the Juan Fernández Islands. In the 1930s, the state sought to tackle the rabbit problem by banning fox hunting, though it was later discovered that indigenous South American foxes rarely preyed on rabbits, preferring native species. In modern times, the European rabbit problem has not been resolved definitively, though a deliberate outbreak of myxomatosis in Tierra del Fuego successfully reduced local rabbit populations. The species remains a problem in central Chile and on Juan Fernández, despite international financing.

Domesticated rabbits

The European rabbit is the only rabbit to be widely domesticated, for food or as a pet. It was first widely kept in ancient Rome, where fetal rabbits were known as laurices and considered a delicacy, and has been refined into a wide variety of breeds during and since the Middle Ages.

Domesticated rabbits have mostly been bred to be much larger than wild rabbits, though selective breeding has produced a range of sizes from "dwarf" to "giant", which are kept as food animals and pets across the world. They have as much color variation among themselves as other livestock and pet animals. Their fur is prized for its softness; today, Angora rabbits are raised for their long, soft fur, which is often spun into yarn. Other breeds are raised for the fur industry, particularly the Rex, which has a smooth, velvet-like coat and occurs in a wide variety of colors and sizes.

Meat and fur
In the United Kingdom, rabbit was a popular food source for the poorer classes. Among wild rabbits, those native to Spain were reputed to have the highest meat quality, followed by those in the Ardennes. As rabbits hold very little fat, they were hardly ever roasted, being instead boiled, fried, or stewed.

The pelt of the rabbit is heavier and more durable than the hare's. Marshall calculated that the value of the skin in proportion to the carcass was greater than that of the sheep and ox. Its fur is primarily used for felting or hats. It is also dyed or clipped, and sold as imitations of more valuable furbearers, such as fur seal. Although cheap and easily acquired, rabbit fur has little durability.

Conservation status
 
Though the European rabbit thrives in many of the locations where it was introduced, in its native Iberia, populations are dwindling. In 2005, the Portuguese Institute for Nature Conservation and Forests classified O. cuniculus in Portugal as "near threatened", while in 2006, Spanish authorities (SECEM) reclassified it in Spain as "vulnerable". In 2018, the International Union for Conservation of Nature reclassified O. cuniculus in Spain, Portugal, and France as "endangered", due to the extent of recent declines. However, worldwide, the species is endangered.

See also

 Cuniculture, on the practice of breeding and raising the domesticated version of the European rabbit
 List of breeds of the domesticated version of the European rabbit

References

Bibliography

External links
 
 

 View the rabbit genome in Ensembl
 

Leporidae
Mammals described in 1758
Fauna of Gibraltar
Mammals of Europe
Mammals of North Africa
Taxa named by Carl Linnaeus